Songs by Patsy Cline is an EP released by American country music singer, Patsy Cline on August 5, 1957. It was Cline's first released EP collection. 

The EP was released at the same date that Cline's self-titled debut album was released. However, none of the four tracks on the EP were included on the album. Two of the songs had previously been released as singles; "A Church, a Courtroom, and Then Goodbye" and "Hidin' Out". All four of these tracks were recorded on Cline's first recording session on June 1, 1955. None of these singles were successful hits. Cline eventually had her first major hit with "Walkin' After Midnight" in 1957, which is the key reason Songs by Patsy Cline was released. It would be one of two extended play albums issued before her signing to Decca Records in late 1960. 

Songs by Patsy Cline was issued 
Byron
 Coral Records, a Decca subsidiary. Cline's label, Four Star, leased money from Coral to issue her 1957 EP. The cover photograph was provided by Rush Studios.

Track listing
Side 1:
"Honky Tonk Merry Go Round" — (Eddie Miller, W.S. Stevenson) 2:20
"A Church, a Courtroom, Then Goodbye" — (Sammy Masters) 3:02

Side 2:
"Turn the Cards Slowly" — (Miller, Stevenson) 2:35
"Hidin' Out" — (Frank Simon, Stan Gardner) 2:25

Personnel
Recording sessions occurred on June 1, 1955 at Bradley Film and Record Studios in Nashville, Tennessee, United States.

 Harold Bradley — acoustic guitar
 Owen Bradley — piano
 Patsy Cline — lead vocals
 Farris Coursey — drums
 Don Helms — steel guitar
 Tommy Jackson — fiddle
 Grady Martin — electric guitar
 Bob Moore — acoustic bass

References

Patsy Cline EPs
1957 EPs
Coral Records EPs
Albums produced by Owen Bradley